Bahman (also Romanized as Bahmān) is a village in Darbqazi Rural District, in the Central District of Nishapur County, Razavi Khorasan Province, Iran. At the 2006 census, its population was 189, in 48 families.

Etymology 
The word bahman has come from the Hindu word Brahman, here there was influence of Brahmin shahis , Hindu Shahis in the past, that's why it was corrupted to bahman!

See also 

 List of cities, towns and villages in Razavi Khorasan Province

References 

Populated places in Nishapur County